Live in Osaka may refer to:

Albums
Live in Osaka, Eastman Wind Ensemble
Live in Osaka (Shonen Knife album) 2006
No Substitutions: Live in Osaka live album by Larry Carlton and Steve Lukather  2001
Live in Osaka, disc by Painkiller in the Japanese edition of Execution Ground
Secret Show: Live in Osaka The Aristocrats (band)